The 2023 Bavarian state election will probably be held on 8 October 2023 to elect the 180 members of the 19th Landtag of Bavaria. The current government is a coalition of the Christian Social Union in Bavaria (CSU) and the Free Voters of Bavaria (FW) led by Minister-President of Bavaria Markus Söder.

Election organization

Election date and preparation deadlines
According to the Bavarian Constitution, the election must be held on a Sunday "at the earliest 59 months, at the latest 62 months" after the preceding state election unless the Landtag is dissolved early, in this case the new election shall be held at the latest on the sixth Sunday after the dissolution. The preceding state election took place on 14 October 2018. This would allow an election date between 17 September and 10 December 2023. The elections since 1978 have always taken place between mid-September and mid-October. The Bavarian state government proposed 8 October 2023 as the election date on 15 November 2022 and officially set it on 13 December 2022 after hearing the parties to the state parliament.

The deadline for determining the population figures, which are decisive for the distribution of the 180 Landtag mandates among the seven Bavarian administrative districts and possible changes of the electoral districts, was 14 July 2021 (33 months after the election of the previous Landtag). On this basis, the Bavarian Ministry of the Interior had to submit a constituency report to the Landtag until 36 months after the election. This was done on 12 October 2021.

Delegates to the internal meetings of the parties can be appointed at the earliest 43 months after the preceding election, i.e. 15 May 2022. The actual district candidates are eligible at the earliest 46 months after the preceding election, i.e. 15 August 2022. The parties and other organised electoral groups which have not been represented continuously in the Bavarian Landtag or in the German Bundestag since their last election on the basis of their own election proposals (CDU, CSU, SPD, Free Voters of Bavaria, Alliance 90/The Greens, FDP, Die Linke, AfD) have to notify their intention to participate to the State Election Commissioner by the 90th day before the election. The actual election proposals and any necessary signatures have to be submitted by the 73rd day before the election.

Electoral system
The Landtag is elected using mixed-member proportional representation. Every voter has two votes, one for a candidate in their electoral district and one for a candidate in their constituency. Both votes are taken into account in the allocation of seats according to proportional representation. The election law was changed 2022 to use the Sainte-Laguë method. There is no state-wide proportional representation; seats are allocated within the seven administrative districts, which are referred to as constituencies (Wahlkreise) in the constitution. An open-list system is used for the constituency seats. Only Parties and electoral groups that win at least 5% of the total votes (sum of first and second votes) in Bavaria participate in the allocation of seats. The constituencies are divided into electoral districts (Stimmkreise), in each of which one MP is directly elected. The number of electoral districts is about half of the seats in the constituency.

Parties
The table below lists parties represented in the 18th Landtag of Bavaria.

Opinion polls

References 

2023 elections in Germany
Future elections in Germany
Elections in Bavaria